Zu Zu is an unincorporated community in Fayette County, Tennessee, United States. It was also called Fowlers Store.

References

External links
 

Unincorporated communities in Fayette County, Tennessee
Unincorporated communities in Tennessee